Live at the Grand Olympic Auditorium is the second live album by the American rock band Rage Against the Machine, released on November 25, 2003, by Epic Records. It is a recording of two shows Rage played at the Grand Olympic Auditorium in their hometown of Los Angeles on September 12 and 13, 2000. The album was originally planned to be released in November 2000, but was delayed due to the break-up of the band shortly after the September concerts. It was then slated for release a year later, but was again delayed due to the formation of Audioslave by the remaining three members of Rage (Tom Morello, Tim Commerford and Brad Wilk) with vocalist Chris Cornell. The album was released amid mixed reviews in November 2003, mainly due to poor mixing rather than musical performance, where on the other hand the DVD version was praised by fans and critics alike.

Track listing

Notes
Bonus tracks "Microphone Fiend" and "Beautiful World" were featured only on the Japan release.

DVD release

Live at the Grand Olympic Auditorium was also released on DVD on December 9, 2003, two weeks after the CD release. The track listing varies from the CD and some tracks are recordings of the opposite night.

Track listing
"Bulls on Parade"
"Bombtrack"
"Calm Like a Bomb"
"Bullet in the Head"
"Sleep Now in the Fire"
"War Within a Breath"
"I'm Housin'"
"Killing in the Name"
"Born of a Broken Man"
"No Shelter"
"Guerrilla Radio"
"How I Could Just Kill a Man"
"Kick Out the Jams"
"Testify"
"Freedom"

"Beautiful World" was included as well in the Japanese release of the DVD.

Bonus material
"People of the Sun" and "Know Your Enemy"
2000 Democratic National Convention performance, featuring:
"Bulls on Parade"
"Testify"
"Guerrilla Radio"
"Sleep Now in the Fire"
"Freedom"
"Killing In The Name"
Video clips for "How I Could Just Kill a Man" and "Bombtrack"

Personnel
Zack de la Rocha – vocals
Tim Commerford – bass
Brad Wilk – drums
Tom Morello – guitar
Rick Rubin – CD producer
Rich Costey – CD mixer
Jeff Richter – DVD director
Chris Palladino – DVD producer
Aimee Macauley – art director

Charts

Certifications

References

Albums produced by Rick Rubin
Rage Against the Machine live albums
Rage Against the Machine video albums
Live video albums
2003 live albums
2003 video albums
Epic Records live albums
Epic Records video albums